Hours of Work and Rest Periods (Road Transport) Convention, 1979 is  an International Labour Organization Convention.

It was established in 1979, with the preamble stating:
Having decided upon the adoption of certain proposals with regard to hours of work and rest periods in road transport,...

Modification 
The convention is a revision of ILO Convention C67, Hours of Work and Rest Periods (Road Transport) Convention, 1939 (shelved).

Ratifications 
As of 2022, the convention has been ratified by nine states.

External links 
Text.
Ratifications.

International Labour Organization conventions
Road transport
Working time
Treaties concluded in 1979
Treaties entered into force in 1983
Treaties of Ecuador
Treaties of Ba'athist Iraq
Treaties of Mexico
Treaties of Spain
Treaties of Switzerland
Treaties of Turkey
Treaties of Ukraine
Treaties of Uruguay
Treaties of Venezuela
1979 in labor relations